Kota Kinabalu West Coast Parkway or Lebuhraya Pantai Barat Kota Kinabalu is a major highway in Kota Kinabalu city, Sabah, Malaysia. The highway was built at the reclamation land in the year 1990s and it was part of the Kota Kinabalu coastal development project such as Sutera Harbour and KK Waterfront.

List of interchanges 

Highways in Malaysia